Murray International Trust is a large British investment trust dedicated to investments in worldwide equities. Established in 1991, the company is a constituent of the FTSE 250 Index. The chairman is David Hardie and its fund managers are Bruce Stout, Martin Connaghan and Samantha Fitzpatrick.

References

External links
  Official site

Financial services companies established in 1991
Investment trusts of the United Kingdom